Angela Salvagno (born January 13 1976) is an American IFBB professional female bodybuilder.

Personal life
Salvagno was born in Willows, California, on January 13, 1976, and raised in Orland, California. She is of Italian, German and Native American descent. Currently, she lives in southern Florida. She excelled at many sports growing up including baseball and earned a black belt in Tae Kwon Do. She is a fitness model. She is also currently involved in product design & manufacturing for a natural product company.

Bodybuilding career
Salvagno started weight training at the age of 16 and competed in her first show 7 years later. Her most notable accomplishment to date is winning the light-heavyweight class and the overall at the 2009 NPC USA Championship earning her pro status.

Contest history
1999 Contra Costa – 2nd (MW)
1999 Sacramento – 1st (HW & overall)
2000 Contra Costa – 2nd (HW)
2000 California – 2nd (HW)
2001 NPC USA Championship – 5th (MW)
2001 NPC Nationals – 16th (HW)
2001 Ironman – 1st (HW & overall)
2002 NPC Nationals – 6th (MW)
2003 NPC Nationals – 8th (MW)
2004 NPC Nationals – 9th (LHW)
2005 NPC USA Championship – 3rd (LHW)
2006 NPC USA Championship – 1st (LHW)
2006 NPC Nationals – 4th (LHW)
2007 NPC USA Championships – 1st (LHW)
2009 NPC USA Championship – 1st (LHW & overall winner)
2009 IFBB Tampa Pro – 6th
2011 IFBB Tampa Pro – 6th
2011 IFBB Europa Battle of Champions – 5th
2015 IFBB Europa physique division – 11th
2018 IFBB Tampa Pro - 11th

External links
Twitter account
Facebook
Angela Salvagno model
Angela Salvagno gallery

References

1976 births
Living people
American female bodybuilders
Sportspeople from California
American people of Italian descent
People from Glenn County, California
Professional bodybuilders
People from Orland, California
21st-century American women